Pachyonychis is a genus of flea beetles in the family Chrysomelidae containing a single described species, P. paradoxa, from the United States.

The name is extremely similar to a different flea beetle, Pachyonychus paradoxus, named in 1847, that occurs on the same host plant; Crotch, in 1873, erroneously thought that Clark's name was spelled the same as the other species, and replaced Clark's name.

References

Alticini
Monotypic Chrysomelidae genera
Articles created by Qbugbot
Taxa named by Hamlet Clark